Mireuksan  is a mountain in the city of Tongyeong, Gyeongsangnam-do in South Korea.

See also
 List of mountains in Korea

Notes

References
  

Mountains of South Korea
Mountains of South Gyeongsang Province